Is the 2009–10 Gimnàstic de Tarragona season.  The club plays in two tournaments: the Segunda División and the Copa del Rey.

Squad

Youth Squad
Youth players with first team experience

League table

References

External links
Gimnàstic's official site
Football Lineups squad

2009–10 in Catalan football
Spanish football clubs 2009–10 season
Gimnàstic de Tarragona seasons